German submarine U-1232 was a Type IX U-boat of Nazi Germany's Kriegsmarine during World War II.

Design
German Type IXC/40 submarines were slightly larger than the original Type IXCs. U-1232 had a displacement of  when at the surface and  while submerged. She had two shafts and two  propellers.

U-1232 was fitted with six  torpedo tubes (four fitted at the bow and two at the stern), 22 torpedoes, one  SK C/32 naval gun, 180 rounds, and a  Flak M42 as well as two twin  C/30 anti-aircraft guns. The boat had a complement of forty-eight.

Service history
She made one offensive patrol, from November 1944 until February 1945, to North America. On 14 January 1945, the boat torpedoed and sank three ships within 13 minutes near Halifax Harbour off the Atlantic coast of Canada. During this action she was damaged so severely that she was forced to return to base.

Fate
In May 1945 the British military captured U-1232 at Wesermünde, Germany. On 4 March 1946 the boat sank at  after she foundered whilst being towed to the scuttling grounds.

Summary of raiding history

References

Bibliography

External links

German Type IX submarines
World War II submarines of Germany
U-boats sunk in 1946
World War II shipwrecks in the Atlantic Ocean
U-boats commissioned in 1944
1943 ships
Ships built in Hamburg